Trondheim, historically Kaupangen, Nidaros and Trondhjem, is a city and municipality in Trøndelag county, Norway. As of 2020, it had a population of 205,332, was the third most populous municipality in Norway, and was the fourth largest urban area. Trondheim lies on the south shore of Trondheim Fjord at the mouth of the River Nidelva. Among the major technology-oriented institutions headquartered in Trondheim are the Norwegian University of Science and Technology (NTNU), the Foundation for Scientific and Industrial Research (SINTEF), and St. Olavs University Hospital.

The settlement was founded in 997 as a trading post, and it served as the capital of Norway during the Viking Age until 1217. From 1152 to 1537, the city was the seat of the Catholic Archdiocese of Nidaros; it then became, and has remained, the seat of the Lutheran Diocese of Nidaros, and the site of the Nidaros Cathedral. It was incorporated in 1838. The current municipality was formed in 1964, when Trondheim merged with Byneset, Leinstrand, Strinda and Tiller, and further expanded 1 January 2020, when Trondheim merged with Klæbu.

Trondheim has a mild climate for its northerly latitude, resulting in moderate summers and winters that often remain above the freezing point in seaside areas. At higher elevations, though, the microclimate is colder and snowier.

The city functions as the seat of the County Mayor of Trøndelag county, but not as its administrative centre (which is Steinkjer). This is designed to avoid making the county administration too centralized.

Trondheim is home to football club Rosenborg, Norway's most successful team, as well as Granåsen Ski Centre which has hosted the World Championship in Nordic Skiing.

Names and etymology

The city was originally given the name by Olav Tryggvason. But it was also just called  ("city") or, more specifically,  ("the city in the district ", i.e. Trøndelag). The name Trøndelag, Norse Þrǿndalǫg, originally meant «the law area of the Trønder (people)» (literally Trønder-law). The first part is the genitive plural of the popular name þrǿndr, «trøndere», which is an old present participle of the verb þróask, «to grow» (with the same root as in «thrive»), and thus can be translated as «the strong, fertile».

During the late Middle Ages people started to call the city just . In the Dano-Norwegian period, during the years as a provincial town in the united kingdoms of Denmark–Norway, the city name was spelt .

Following the example set by the renaming of the capital  to Oslo,  was reintroduced as the official name of the city for a brief period from 1 January 1930 until 6 March 1931. Public outrage later in the same year, even taking the form of riots, forced the Storting to settle for the medieval city name Trondheim.

Trondheim was briefly named  during the Second World War, as a German exonym.

History 

Trondheim was named Kaupangen by Viking King Olav Tryggvason in 997 CE. Shortly thereafter it came to be called Nidaros. In the beginning it was frequently used as a military retainer (Old Norse: "hird"-man) of King Olav I. It was also frequently used as the seat of the king, and was the capital of Norway until 1217.

People have been living in the region for thousands of years, as evidenced by the rock carvings in central Norway, the Nøstvet and Lihult cultures and the Corded Ware culture. In ancient times, the kings of Norway were hailed in Trondheim at Øretinget, the place for the assembly of all free men by the mouth of the River Nidelva. Harald Fairhair (865–933) was hailed as the king here, as was his son, Haakon I, called 'the Good'. The battle of Kalvskinnet took place in Trondheim in 1179: King Sverre Sigurdsson and his Birkebeiner warriors were victorious against Erling Skakke (a rival to the throne). Some scholars believe that the famous Lewis chessmen, 12th century chess pieces carved from walrus ivory that were found in the Hebrides and are now at the British Museum, may have been made in Trondheim.

From 1152, Trondheim was the seat of the Archbishop of Nidaros for Norway, which operated from the Archbishop's Palace. Due to the introduction of Lutheran Protestantism in 1537, the last archbishop, Olav Engelbrektsson, had to flee from the city to the Netherlands; he died in what today is Lier, Belgium.

From the 16th through the 19th  centuries, the city was repeatedly ravaged by fires that caused widespread damage, since many of its buildings were made of wood. The worst of these occurred in 1598, 1651, 1681, 1708, 1717 (twice), 1742, 1788, 1841 and 1842. The 1651 fire destroyed 90% of all buildings within the city limits. After the "Horneman Fire" in 1681, there was an almost total reconstruction of the city, overseen by General Johan Caspar von Cicignon, who was originally from Luxembourg. Broad avenues, such as Munkegata, were created, without regard for private property rights, with the aim of limiting the damage from any future fires. At the time, the city had a population of under 10,000 inhabitants, with most living in the downtown area.

After the Treaty of Roskilde on 26 February 1658, Trondheim and the rest of Trøndelag became Swedish territory for a brief period, but the area was reconquered 10 months later. The conflict was finally settled by the Treaty of Copenhagen on 27 May 1660.

During the Second World War, Trondheim was occupied by Nazi Germany from 9 April 1940, the first day of the invasion of Norway, until the end of the war in Europe, 8 May 1945. The German invasion force consisted of the German cruiser Admiral Hipper, 4 destroyers and 1700 Austrian Mountain troops. Except for a coastal battery that opened fire, there was no resistance to the invasion, which began on 9 April at 5 AM. On 14 and 17 April, British and French forces landed near Trondheim in a failed attempt to liberate Trondheim, as part of the Namsos Campaign. During the occupation, Trondheim was the home of the notorious Norwegian Gestapo agent, Henry Rinnan, who operated from a nearby villa and infiltrated Norwegian resistance groups. The city and its citizens were subjected to harsh treatment by the occupying power, including the imposition of martial law in October 1942. This new metropolis was to be accompanied by a massively expanded version of the already existing naval base, which was intended to become the future primary stronghold of the German Kriegsmarine. A start was made on this enormous construction project, but it was far from completed when the war ended, and today, there are few physical remains of it.

Municipal history
The city of Trondheim was established on 1 January 1838 (see formannskapsdistrikt). On 1 January 1864, part of Strinda (population: 1,229) was amalgamated with Trondheim. Then, on 1 January 1893, another part of Strinda (population: 4,097) was transferred to Trondheim. On 1 January 1952, the Lade area of Strinda (population: 2,230) was transferred to Trondheim. On 1 January 1964, a major municipal merger took place: the neighbouring municipalities of Leinstrand (population: 4,193), Byneset (population: 2,049), Strinda (population: 44,600), and Tiller (population: 3,595) were all merged with the city of Trondheim (population: 56,982), which nearly doubled the population of the municipality. On 1 January 2020, the neighboring Klæbu Municipality (population: 6,050) was merged with Trondheim Municipality.

Coat of arms and seal

The coat of arms dates back to the 13th century. To the left, there is an archbishop with his staff and mitre in a church archway. On the right, a crowned king holding scales in a castle archway. These two pictures rest on a base which forms an arch. Underneath that arch, are three male heads which symbolise the city's rank as Norway's first capital and the archbishop's place of residence. The scales symbolise justice and the motif is based on the political philosophy of the 13th century, where the balance of power between king and church was an important issue. The three heads at the bottom may symbolise the city council. The motif is unique in Norwegian municipal heraldry, but similar motifs are found in bishopric cities on the continent. The design of the coat-of-arms that was adopted in 1897, and is still used today, was made by Håkon Thorsen.

Geography 

Trondheim is situated where the River Nidelva meets Trondheim Fjord with an excellent harbour and sheltered condition. In the Middle Ages the river was deep enough to be navigable by most boats. However, in the mid-17th century, an avalanche of mud and stones made it less navigable, and partly ruined the harbour.
At the summer solstice, the sun rises at 03:00 and sets at 23:40, but stays just below the horizon. Between 23 May and 19 July, when the sky is cloud-free, it remains light enough at night that no artificial lighting is needed outdoors. At the winter solstice, the sun rises at 10:01, stays very low above the horizon (at midday its altitude is slightly more than 3 degrees over the horizon), and sets at 14:31.

Climate 

Trondheim city has an oceanic climate (Cfb) or humid continental climate (Dfb), depending on the winter threshold used (−3 °C or 0 °C). The part of the municipality further away from the fjord has slightly colder winters, while the part close to the fjord has the mildest winters. Trondheim is mostly sheltered from the strong south and southwesterly winds which can occur along the outer seaboard but is more exposed to northwesterly winds. As with the rest of Norway, the weather is dependent on the weather pattern. High pressure over Central Norway or to the east gives sunny weather which can last for weeks. Conversely, Atlantic Lows can also dominate for weeks, and both patterns can happen all year. This was demonstrated in 2020 when May saw northwesterlies with cold air from the Greenland Sea lasting three weeks into the month, and snowfall in mid-May, setting a new record for snow in May. The next month, high pressure and weeks with southeasterlies gave the warmest June on record, with 345 sun hours and Trondheim Airport recording a new record high , Norway's warmest high in 2020. 
Trondheim experiences moderate snowfall from November to March, but mixed with mild weather and rainfall. There is often more snow and later snowmelt in suburban areas at a higher elevation, with good skiing conditions in Bymarka. All the monthly record lows are from 1955 or older, with half of them from before 1920. The last overnight frost in June was in 1958, and the coldest night in May after year 2000 had low −2.7 °C. The May record low is from 1900, 3.7 °C colder than the second coldest May night. The all-time low  was recorded February 1899. The all-time high  was recorded 22 July 1901. The warmest month on record is July 2014 with mean  and average daily high  (airport). The coldest month on record is February 1966 with mean  and average daily low  (airport). The average date for the last overnight freeze (low below ) in spring is 1 May  and average date for first freeze in autumn is 9 October giving a frost-free season of 160 days (Trondheim Airport Værnes 1981-2010 average). 
The earliest weather stations were located closer to the city centre, from 1945 onwards the weather station has been located at a higher elevation (Voll, 127 m and Tyholt, 113 m), therefore being slightly colder.
A new sunrecorder was established by met.no in the city at Gløshaugen (NTNU) December 2015, recording more sunhrs than earlier sunrecorder, which had terrain blocking issues. There are on average 229 sunhours in July (based 2016–2020). Trondheim recorded 197 sunhours in October 2016 beating the previous national record for October. In April 2019, Trondheim recorded 308 sunhours, setting a new national record for April. In contrast, December 2016 only recorded 10 sunhours.

Fauna
The city has various wetland habitats. among which there is the Gaulosen. The observation tower accommodates for birdwatching and providing information about birdlife.

Despite Trondheim being Norway's third largest city, wild animals can be seen. Otters and beavers thrive in Nidelva and Bymarka. Badgers and red foxes are not uncommon sights. Moose and deer are common in the hills surrounding the city, and might wander into the city, especially in May when the one-year-olds are chased away by their mothers, or in late winter when food grows scarce in the snow-covered higher regions. From 2002 until 2017, a wolverine lived in Bymarka.

Cityscape and sites 

Most of Trondheim city centre is scattered with small speciality shops. However, the main shopping area is concentrated around the pedestrianised streets Nordre gate, Olav Tryggvasons gate and Thomas Angells gate even though the rest of the city centre is provided with everything from old, well-established companies to new, hip and trendy shops.

In the mid-to-late 1990s, the area surrounding the old drydock and ship construction buildings of the defunct Trondhjems mekaniske Værksted shipbuilding company at the Nedre Elvehavn was renovated and old industrial buildings were torn down to make way for condominiums. A shopping centre was also built, known as Solsiden (The Sunny Side). This is a popular residential and shopping area, especially for young people.

DORA 1 is a German submarine base that housed the 13th U-boat Flotilla during the Second World War occupation of Norway. Today the bunker houses various archives, among them the city archives, the university and state archives. More recently, DORA has been used as a concert venue.

Kristiansten Fortress, built 1681–1684, is located on a hill east of Trondheim. It repelled the invading Swedes in 1718, but was decommissioned in 1816 by Crown Prince Regent Charles John.

A statue of Olav Tryggvason, the founder of Trondheim, is located in the city's central square, mounted on top of an obelisk. The statue base is also a sun dial, but it is calibrated to UTC+1 so that the reading is inaccurate by one hour in the summer.

The islet Munkholmen is a popular tourist attraction and recreation site. The islet has served as a place of execution, a monastery, a fortress, prison, and a Second World War anti-aircraft gun station.

Stiftsgården is the royal residence in Trondheim, originally constructed in 1774 by Cecilie Christine Schøller. At 140 rooms constituting , it is possibly the largest wooden building in Northern Europe and has been used by royals and their guests since 1800.

A statue of Leif Ericson is located at the seaside, close to the old Customs Building, the cruise ship facilities and the new swimming hall. The statue is a replica, the original being located at a Seattle marina.

Nidaros Cathedral 
The Nidaros Cathedral and the Archbishop's Palace are located side by side in the middle of the city centre. The cathedral, built from 1070 on, is the most important Gothic monument in Norway and was Northern Europe's most important Christian pilgrimage site during the Middle Ages, with pilgrimage routes leading to it from Oslo in southern Norway and from the Jämtland and Värmland regions of Sweden. Today, it is the northernmost medieval cathedral in the world, and the second-largest in Scandinavia.

During the Middle Ages, and again after independence was restored in 1814, the Nidaros Cathedral was the coronation church of the Norwegian kings. King Haakon VII was the last monarch to be crowned there, in 1906. Starting with King Olav V in 1957, coronation was replaced by consecration. In 1991, the present King Harald V and Queen Sonja were consecrated in the cathedral. On 24 May 2002, their daughter Princess Märtha Louise married the writer Ari Behn in the cathedral.

The Pilgrim's Route (Pilegrimsleden) to the site of Saint Olufs's tomb at Nidaros Cathedral, has recently been re-instated. There is a Pilgrim's Office in Oslo which gives advice to pilgrims and a Pilgrim Centre in Trondheim, under the aegis of the cathedral, which awards certificates to successful pilgrims upon the completion of their journey.

Other churches 
The Lutheran Church of Norway has 21 churches within the municipality of Trondheim. They are all a part of the Diocese of Nidaros, which is based in Trondheim at the Nidaros Cathedral. Many of the churches are several hundred years old, with a couple which were built almost 1,000 years ago.

The Roman Catholic Sankt Olav domkirke is the cathedral episcopal see of the exempt Territorial Prelature of Trondheim. Being located across the street from the Nidaros Cathedral, the two of them form an unofficial religious quarter along with a synagogue, a Baptist church, a Salvation Army office, and the 8-auditorium cinema Prinsen kinosenter.

Museums 
Sverresborg, also named Zion after King David's castle in Jerusalem, was a fortification built by Sverre Sigurdsson. It is now an open-air museum, consisting of more than 60 buildings. The castle was originally built in 1182–1183, but did not last for long as it was burned down in 1188. However, the Sverresaga indicates it had been restored by 1197.

The Trondheim Science Center is a scientific hands-on experience center. The NTNU University Museum (Norwegian: NTNU Vitenskapsmuseet) is part of the Norwegian University of Science and Technology. There are also a variety of small history, science and natural history museums, such as the Trondheim Maritime Museum, the Armoury, adjacent to the Archbishops's Palace, Kristiansten Fortress, the music and musical instrument museum Ringve National Museum, Ringve Botanical Garden, the Trondheim Tramway Museum, and the Jewish Museum, co-located with the city's synagogue, which is among the northernmost in the world.

Rockheim (The National Discovery Center for Pop and Rock) opened at the Pier in August 2010. It is located inside an old warehouse, but characterised by an easily recognisable roof in the shape of a box. "The box" is decorated by thousands of tiny lights that change in a variety of colours and patterns, and is a landmark in the cityscape – especially on dark winter evenings.

Prison 
Vollan District Jail (Norwegian: Vollan kretsfengsel) was a jail during the nazi occupation of Norway and was used to imprison both prisoners of war and criminals. Vollan was not considered a concentration camp. In a summary of prisoners of war in Norway, numerous prisoners were registered at Vollan. One of its roles was as a transit camp for political prisoners. Many prisoners were taken from Vollan to Kristiansten Fortress and shot. The prisoners at Vollan were interrogated at the Mission Hotel in Trondheim.  Some were also interrogated by Henry Rinnan and his gang. It was closed in 1971 after the opening of Trondheim Prison at Tunga.

Trondheim Prison (Norwegian: Trondheim fengsel) is a prison that belongs to the Northern Region of the Norwegian Correctional Services. The prison can house 184 inmates.

It consists of four main departments: 
Nermarka ("Tunga") – closed department
Detention department (no: Forvaringsavdelingen) at Nermarka
Leira – open division.  Through joint positive activities, the individual inmate on certain conditions teaches to be responsible with other people.
division Kongens gt. – halfway house, located in downtown Trondheim.

Government
The municipality is governed by a municipal council of elected representatives, which in turn elect a mayor.

On 1 January 2005, the city was reorganized from five boroughs into four, with each of these having separate social services offices. The current boroughs are Midtbyen (44,967 inhabitants), Østbyen (42,707 inhabitants), Lerkendal (46,603 inhabitants) and Heimdal (30,744) inhabitants. The Population statistics listed are as of 1 January 2008. Prior to 2005, Trondheim was divided into the boroughs Sentrum, Strinda, Nardo, Byåsen and Heimdal.

Municipal council
The city council (Bystyret) of Trondheim is made up of 67 representatives that are elected every four years.  Prior to 2011, there were 85 city council members, but this number was reduced to 67 in 2011.  The party breakdown of the council is as follows:

Education and research 

See also the list of primary schools in Trondheim.

Trondheim is home to both the Norwegian University of Science and Technology (NTNU) with its many technical lab facilities and disciplines, and BI-Trondheim, a satellite campus for the Norwegian Business School (BI). Both universities welcome a number of international students on a yearly basis and offer various scholarships.

St. Olav’s University Hospital, a regional hospital for Central Norway, is located in downtown Trondheim. St. Olav's is a teaching hospital and cooperates closely with the Norwegian University of Science and Technology (NTNU) on both research and medical education.

SINTEF, the largest independent research organisation in Scandinavia, has 1,800 employees with 1,300 of these located in Trondheim. The Air Force Academy of the Royal Norwegian Air Force is located at Kuhaugen in Trondheim.

The Geological Survey of Norway is located at Lade in Trondheim and is a major geoscientific institution with 220 employees of which 70% are scientists.

There are 11 high schools in the city. Trondheim katedralskole ("Trondheim Cathedral School") was founded in 1152 and is the oldest upper secondary school (gymnasium) in Norway, while Charlottenlund videregående skole is the largest in Sør-Trøndelag with its 1,100 students and 275 employees. Brundalen Skole, has big festivals each year, and is building out to increase space.

Ila skole was founded in 1770 and is the oldest primary school in Trondheim.

Media 
Adresseavisen is the largest regional newspaper and the oldest active newspaper in Norway, having been established in 1767. The two headquarters of the Norwegian Broadcasting Corporation (NRK) are located at Tyholt in Trondheim, and in Oslo. On 31 December 2019 the fully digital and local newspaper Nidaros was launched as a competitor to Adresseavisen. The student press of Trondheim features three types of media. Under Dusken is the student paper, Radio Revolt is the student radio, and Student-TV broadcasts videos online.

Radio stations established in Trondheim include Trøndelag-focused opt-out feeds of NRK P1 and NRK P1+, local versions of NRK Trafikk and P5 Hits, Radio Trondheim, and Radio 247. Along with Norway's national radio stations, they can be listened to on DAB+ across most of Trøndelag, as well as on internet radio.

Culture

Visual arts
The Trondheim Art Museum has Norway's third largest public art collection, mainly Norwegian art from the last 150 years.

The  boasts a large collection of decorative arts and design, including a great number of tapestries from the Norwegian tapestry artist Hannah Ryggen, as well as Norway's only permanent exhibibition of Japanese arts and crafts.

Trøndelag senter for samtidskunst (TSSK) was established in 1976.

There are two artist-run spaces, that was founded by students of the Trondheim Academy of Fine Art in 2002, and Babel, that was founded by Lademoen Kunstnerverksteder (LKV) in 2006.

Kunsthall Trondheim was inaugurated at its permanent premises on Kongens gate in October 2016.

Stage
The main regional theatre, Trøndelag Teater, is situated in Trondheim. Built in 1816, the theatre is the oldest theatre still in use in Scandinavia. The city also features an alternative theatre house Teaterhuset Avant Garden, and the theatre company Teater Fusentast.

Music

Trondheim has a broad music scene, and is known for its strong communities committed to rock, jazz and classical music. The city's interest in Jazz and classical music are spearheaded by the music conservatory at NTNU which has been called one of the most innovative in the world, and the municipal music school, Trondheim Kommunale Musikk- og Kulturskole. The Trondheim Symphony Orchestra and the Trondheim Soloists are well-known. The city also hosts a yearly Jazz festival, and is home to Trondheim Jazz Orchestra.

Classical artists hailing from Trondheim include violinist Arve Tellefsen, Elise Båtnes and Marianne Thorsen. Also the Nidaros Cathedral Boys' Choir.

Thomas Bergersen, a Norwegian self-taught composer, multi-instrumentalist, and the co-founder of the production music company Two Steps From Hell, was born in Trondheim.

Pop/rock artists and bands associated with Trondheim include Åge Aleksandersen, Margaret Berger, DumDum Boys, Lasse Marhaug, Gåte, Keep Of Kalessin, Lumsk, Motorpsycho, Kari Rueslåtten, the 3rd and the Mortal, TNT, Tre Små Kinesere, the Kids, Bokassa, Casino Steel (of the Boys), Atrox, Bloodthorn, Manes, child prodigy Malin Reitan and Aleksander With. The most popular punk scene is UFFA.

Georg Kajanus, creator of the bands Eclection, Sailor and DATA, was born in Trondheim. The music production team Stargate started out in Trondheim.

Trondheim is also home to Rockheim, the national museum of popular music, which is responsible for collecting, preserving and sharing Norwegian popular music from the 1950s to the present day.

Film
Trondheim features a lively film scene, including three filmfests: Minimalen Short Film Fest and Kosmorama International Film Fest in March, and Trondheim Documentarfestival in November. Trondheim has two cinemas in the center of the city, Prinsen Kino and Nova kino Prinsen Kinosenter, Nova Kinosenter

Student culture

With students comprising almost a fifth of the population, the city of Trondheim is heavily influenced by student culture. Most noticeable is Studentersamfundet i Trondhjem, the city's student society. Its characteristic round, red building from 1929 sits at the head of the bridge crossing the river southwards from the city centre. As the largest university in Norway, the Norwegian University of Science and Technology (NTNU) is the host of some 36,000 students.

Student culture in Trondheim is characterised by a long-standing tradition of volunteer work. The student society is for example run by more than 1,200 volunteers. NTNUI, Norway's largest sports club, is among the other volunteer organisations that dominate student culture in Trondheim. Students in Trondheim are also behind two major Norwegian culture festivals, UKA and The International Student Festival in Trondheim (ISFiT). NTNU lists over 200 student organisations with registered web pages on its servers alone.

In popular culture
Trondheim culture is parodied on the Monty Python album Another Monty Python Record in the form of the fictitious Trondheim Hammer Dance.

Trondheim is also a key location in the Command & Conquer: Tiberian Sun universe, as it is a critical battleground for both factions.

Trondheim was the name of a planet in the Hundred Worlds of the Ender's Game novel series.

Sports and recreation
Granåsen Ski Centre, a Nordic skiing venue located in Byåsen, regularly hosts World Cup competitions in ski jumping, biathlon and cross-country skiing, as well as the 1997 FIS Nordic World Ski Championships. Trondheim attempted but failed to become the Norwegian candidate for the 2018 Winter Olympics. Hiking and recreational skiing is available around the city, particularly in Bymarka, which can be reached by the tramway. Trondheim Golfklubb has a nine-hole golf course in Byåsen.

Rosenborg BK is one of the city's two premier football clubs and plays their home matches at Lerkendal Stadion. They have won the Norwegian Premier League 26 times between 1967 and 2018, have reached the UEFA Champions League group stage 12 times, and made it to the last 8 on one occasion. Ranheim Fotball is the city's second premier football club having been promoted from the Norwegian First Division to join Eliteserien in 2018, coming in at seventh place out of 16 in its first season. Byåsen IL plays in the women's handball league, and is a regular in the EHF Women's Champions League, playing their home games at Trondheim Spektrum.

Trondheim and Trøndelag is also regarded as the home of the basse game.

Major sports teams

Major championships hosted

Transportation 

Trondheim has an international airport, Trondheim Airport, Værnes, situated in Stjørdal, which is Norway's fourth largest airport in terms of passenger traffic. Værnes has non-stop connections to cities such as London, Amsterdam, Copenhagen, and Stockholm, among others. The domestic route Trondheim – Oslo is among the busiest air routes in Europe with around 2 million passengers annually.

Major railway connections are the northbound Nordland Line, the eastbound Meråker Line to Åre and Östersund in Sweden, and two southbound connections to Oslo, the Røros Line and Dovre Line.

The Coastal Express ships (Hurtigruten: Covering the Bergen–Kirkenes stretch of the coast) call at Trondheim, as do many cruise ships during the summer season. Since 1994 there is also a fast commuter boat service to Kristiansund, the closest coastal city to the southwest. Every morning the Hurtigruten ships have one southbound and one northbound arrival and departure in Trondheim.

A car ferry route from the port of Flakk in the northwest of the municipality, connects Trondheim with Fosen. Various bridge projects over the Trondheim Fjord to replace the ferry have been planned, but none have begun construction.

Trondheim also boasts the northernmost (since closure of Arkhangelsk tram in 2004) tramway line in the world: the Gråkallen Line, the last remaining segment of the Trondheim Tramway, is an  route (which is mostly single-track outside the innermost parts of the city; except the stretch between Breidablikk and Nordre Hoem stations) which runs from the city centre, through the Byåsen district, and up to Lian, in the large recreation area Bymarka. Trondheim boasts the world's only bicycle lift, Trampe.

The bus network, operated by AtB, runs throughout most of the city and its suburbs. A new metro line system went public 3 August 2019. The new transportation system covers the Trondheim area (Trondheim, Malvik, and Melhus). The three metro lines and the city lines that link the city across. The new public transport system becomes flexible, with buses running more often and accommodating more passengers. Fewer travelers must take a detour through the center of Trondheim.

In addition, the Nattbuss (Night Bus) service ensures cheap and effective transport for those enjoying nightlife in the city centre during the weekends. The Nattbus has other prices than ordinary buses. The European route E6 highway passes through the city centre of Trondheim in addition to a motorway bypass along the eastern rim of the city.

Twin towns – sister cities

Trondheim is twinned with:

 Darmstadt, Germany (1968)
 Dunfermline, Scotland, United Kingdom (1945)
 Graz, Austria (1968)
 Klaksvík, Faroe Islands (1987)
 Kópavogur, Iceland (1946)
 Norrköping, Sweden (1946)
 Odense, Denmark (1946)
 Petah Tikva, Israel (1975)
 Ramallah, Palestine (2004)
 Split, Croatia (1956)
 Tampere, Finland (1946)
 Tiraspol, Moldova (1987)
 Vallejo, United States (1960)

Business
 
Lilleby smelteverk (1927–2002)

Notable people

Public Service & public thinking 

 Lisbet Nypan (ca.1610–1670) an executed alleged Norwegian witch
 Ove Bjelke (1611–1674) nobleman, feudal lord and Chancellor of Norway
 Albert Angell (1660–1705) landowner, businessman and Mayor of Trondheim
 Peter Tordenskiold (1691–1720) a Dano-Norwegian nobleman and flag officer
 Hilchen Sommerschild (1756–1831) pioneer educator
 Frederik Due (1796–1873) Norwegian prime minister in Stockholm, 1841–1858
 Johan Thoning Owesen (1804–1881), shipowner, landowner and philanthropist
 Hans Gerhard Colbjørnsen Meldahl (1815–1877) politician and sixth Chief Justice of the Supreme Court of Norway, 1874–1877
 John Gunder North (1826–1872) ship builder in San Francisco
 Fritz Jenssen (1886–1966) banker and politician for Nasjonal Samling
 Bernt Ingvaldsen (1902–1985) politician, President of the Storting 1965–1972
 David Abrahamsen (1903–2002) forensic psychiatrist, psychoanalyst and author in the USA
 John Lyng (1905–1978) a politician, briefly Prime Minister of Norway in 1963
 Anne Margrethe Strømsheim (1914–2008) nurse and Norwegian resistance member 
 Henry Thingstad (1916-1942) sports official, communist politician, and Norwegian resistance member 
 Henrik Rogstad (1916–1945) a politician with Nasjonal Samling
 Cissi Klein (1929–1943 in Auschwitz) a Jewish girl, victim of the Holocaust
 Kaare Langlete (1931–2009) military officer and Lord Chamberlain
 Idun Reiten (born 1942) mathematician 
 Per Arne Watle (born 1948) politician and CEO of Widerøe 1997–2008
 Erik Varden (born 1974) RC Bishop of Trondheim

The Arts 

 Carl Lorck (1829–1882) a Norwegian painter
 Knut Glomsaas (1863–1935) a military musician
 Tupsy Clement (1871–1959) a Skagen painter of landscapes 
 Emmy Worm-Müller (1875–1950) silent film actress 
 Arne Eggen (1881–1955) a classical composer and organist
 Bjarne Amdahl (1903–1968) pianist, composer and orchestra conductor 
 Erling Viksjø (1910–1971) architect, exponent of architectural modernism
 Agnar Mykle (1915–1994) author, controversial figure in Norwegian literature
 Arve Tellefsen (born 1936) classical violinist
 Liv Ullman (born 1938) actress and director 
 Jan Erik Kongshaug (1944–2019) sound engineer, jazz guitarist and composer 
 Sidsel Endresen (born 1952) singer, composer and actress
 Trond Halstein Moe (born 1954), operatic baritone
 Brit Dyrnes (born 1955), ceramist
 Geir Lysne (born 1965) a jazz musician and Big Band leader
 Øystein Baadsvik (born 1966) tuba soloist and chamber musician
 Merethe Trøan (born 1970) singer at the 1992 Eurovision Song Contest
 Elise Båtnes (born 1971) violinist, leader of the Oslo Philharmonic orchestra since 2006
 Ingrid Lorentzen (born 1972) ballet dancer, artistic director of the Norwegian National Ballet
 Thomas Bergersen (born 1980) composer and multi-instrumentalist

Sports 

 Nils Uhlin Hansen (1919–1945) long jumper and Norwegian resistance member in WWII. 
 Hjalmar Andersen (1923–2013) speed skater, triple gold medalist at the 1952 Winter Olympics
 Arnfinn Bergmann (1928–2011) ski jumper, gold medallist at the 1952 Winter Olympics
 Odd Iversen (1945–2014) a footballer with 282 club caps and 45 for Norway
 Jan Egil Storholt (born 1949) speed skater, gold medallist at the 1976 Winter Olympics
 Ingrid Kristiansen (born 1956) former long-distance runner
 Frode Rønning (born 1959) speed skater, bronze medallist at the 1980 Winter Olympics
 Rune Bratseth (born 1961) former footballer with 313 club caps and 60 for Norway
 Atle Kvålsvoll (born 1962) cyclist and coach
 Roar Strand (born 1970) footballer with 464 club caps and 42 for Norway
 Bjørn Otto Bragstad (born 1971) footballer with 251 club caps and 15 for Norway
 Gøril Kringen (born 1972) former footballer and coach
 Vegard Heggem (born 1975) former footballer with 20 caps for Norway
 Fredrik Winsnes (born 1975) former footballer with 353 club caps and 19 for Norway
 Øystein Kvaal Østerbø (born 1981) orienteering and ski-orienteering competitor
 Trine Rønning (born 1982) a former captain of the Norway women's national football team
 Emil Hegle Svendsen (born 1985) biathlete, eight medals at Winter Olympics (four gold)
 Torstein Horgmo (born 1987) snowboarder
 Emil Weber Meek (born 1988) mixed martial artist
 Jørgen Gråbak (born 1991) Nordic combined skier, double gold at the 2014 Winter Olympics
 Sander Sagosen (born 1995) handball player
 Alexander Sørloth (born 1995) footballer
 Johannes Høsflot Klæbo (born 1996) a cross-country skier, triple gold medallist at the 2018 Winter Olympics

See also 

List of mayors of Trondheim
Norwegian Society for Photobiology and Photomedicine (1983)
Tyholt Tower

References

Further reading

External links 

 Municipality website 
 Trondheim.no, Trondheim's official website in Norwegian 
 and Trondheim.com, Trondheim's official website in English
 
 Visit Trondheim

 
Cities and towns in Norway
Port cities and towns in Norway
Former capitals of Norway
Former national capitals
Viking Age populated places
997 establishments
10th-century establishments in Norway
Municipalities of Trøndelag